Gabuza is a surname. Notable people with the surname include:

 Abel Gabuza (1955–2021), South African Roman Catholic prelate
 Joel Gabuza, Zimbabwean politician
 Thamsanqa Gabuza (born 1987), South African footballer

Surnames of African origin